Prospero Vitelliano was a Roman Catholic prelate who served as Bishop of Bisignano (1569–1575).

Biography
On 22 April 1569, Prospero Vitelliano  was appointed during the papacy of Pope Pius V as Bishop of Bisignano. On 3 May 1569, he was consecrated bishop by Giulio Antonio Santorio, Archbishop of Santa Severina, with Umberto Locati, Bishop of Bagnoregio, and Cesare Ferrante, Bishop of Termoli, serving as co-consecrators. He served as Bishop of Bisignano until his resignation in 1575.

References

External links and additional sources
 (for Chronology of Bishops) 
 (for Chronology of Bishops) 

16th-century Italian Roman Catholic bishops
Bishops appointed by Pope Pius V